Trithiazyl trichloride is the inorganic compound with the formula . A white solid, it is a precursor to other sulfur nitrides, but has no commercial applications.

Structure
The molecule is a 6-membered ring of alternating nitrogen and sulfur atoms, where each sulfur atom is attached to one chlorine atom by a single bond. The molecule contains alternating single and double bonds in the  core. The molecule has C3v symmetry. The  core is slightly ruffled structure with S-N distances of 160.5 pm. The S-Cl distances are 208 pm, and the chlorine atoms are mutually cis. The S centers are tetravalent and pyramidal. In contrast to the NSCl connectivity, nitrosyl chloride has the connectivity ONCl.

Synthesis and reactions
Trithiazyl trichloride is obtained by chlorination of tetrasulfur tetranitride:

At 100 °C in vacuum, thiazyl chloride trimer undergoes cracking to thiazyl chloride monomer, which is a green gas.

In N≡S−Cl, chlorine is bonded to sulfur, in contrast to nitrosyl chloride O=N–Cl, where chlorine is bonded to nitrogen. In contrast, with six fewer electrons, cyanuric chloride is a planar ring.

It reacts with nitriles to dithiadiazolium chlorides:

The compound oxidizes to the S(VI) compound , which exists as isomers.

References

Inorganic chlorine compounds
Sulfur(IV) compounds
Nitrides
Sulfur–nitrogen compounds
Six-membered rings